Håkan Rudström (born 5 January 1957) is a Swedish curler and curling coach.

In 1980 he was inducted into the Swedish Curling Hall of Fame.

Teams

Private life
Rudström is from family of curlers. His older brother Björn was Håkan's teammate when they won the World and European championships. Håkan's daughter Amalia played for Sweden at the 2012 Winter Youth Olympics.

References

External links
 

Håkan hade snyggaste figuren! - IK Fyris curling - IdrottOnline Klubb
Håkan tar Brallans nyårsfigur! - IK Fyris curling - IdrottOnline Klubb

Living people
1957 births
Swedish male curlers
World curling champions
European curling champions
Swedish curling champions
20th-century Swedish people